Francesco Guarini (died 1569) was a Roman Catholic prelate who served as Bishop of Imola (1561–1569).

Biography
On 24 Oct 1561, Francesco Guarini was appointed during the papacy of Pope Pius IV as Bishop of Imola.
He served as Bishop of Imola until his death in 1569.

References

External links and additional sources
 (for Chronology of Bishops) 
 (for Chronology of Bishops) 

16th-century Italian Roman Catholic bishops
Bishops appointed by Pope Pius IV
1569 deaths